is a Japanese Neoclassical metal / Power metal band formed in 1996 and led by guitarist Norifumi Shima.

The band's first two albums were reissued by InsideOut Music in 2003.

Members

Current
 Norifumi Shima – guitar (1996– )
 Shigeharu Nakayasu – bass (2015– )
 Atsushi Kawatsuka – drums (2015– )
 Wataru Haga – vocals (2018– )
 Ryo Miyake – keyboards (2018– )

Former
 Takao Ozaki – vocals (1996–1999)
 Osamu Harada – keyboards (1996–1997)
 Nobuho Yoshioka – drums (1996)
 Kosaku Mitani – bass (1996–2003, 2009 & 2012–2014 as support member)
 Ichiro Nagai – drums (1997–2001)
 Toshiyuki Koike – keyboards (1998–2009)
 Takashi Inoue – vocals (2000–2011)
 Junichi Sato – drums (2001–2004)
 Takanobu Kimoto – bass (2003–2009)
 Shoichi Takeoka – drums (2004)
 Masayuki Osada – drums (2007–2015)
 Toshiyuki Sugimori – bass (2009–2012)
 Aki – keyboards (2013–2014 as support member, 2015–2017)
 Atsushi Kuze – vocals (2011–2018)

Timeline

Discography

Studio albums
 Fragments of the Moon (1997)
 From Father to Son (1998)
 Rain Forest (1999)
 Gate of Triumph (2001)
 Destruction and Creation (self-cover album, 2002)
 Life on the Wire (2003)
 After the Double Cross (2004)
 Decade of the Moon (Boxed set, 2008)
 Rise from Ashes (2008)
 Angel of Chaos (2010)
 Savior Never Cry (2011)
 Black Flame (2013)
 Between Life and Death (2015)
 Tears of Messiah (2017)
 Ouroboros (self-cover album, 2019)
 Rain Fire (2020)

EPs
 Time to Die (1999) 	
 Concerto Moon (2004)
 Live and Rare (2014)

Live albums
 Live Concerto (1997)
 The End of the Beginning (1999)
 Live: Once in a Life Time (2003)
 Live for Today, Hope for Tomorrow (2011)

Videos
 Live The End of the Beginning (VHS, 2000) (DVD, 2003)
 Live – Once in a Life Time (DVD, 2003)
 Live Concerto – Remastering (DVD, 2008)
 Live from Ashes (DVD, 2009)

References

External links 
 

Japanese power metal musical groups
Musical groups established in 1996
Musical groups from Kanagawa Prefecture